Sinclair-Stevenson Ltd is a British publisher founded in 1989 by Christopher Sinclair-Stevenson.

Christopher Sinclair-Stevenson became an editor at Hamish Hamilton in 1961. Thirteen years later in 1974 he became managing director, establishing "a close-knit and successful team", he "developed an unrivalled reputation for looking after his authors". Then in 1989 he resigned and set up his own company, Sinclair-Stevenson Ltd, and took a number of staff and authors with him.

Sinclair-Stevenson Ltd was subsumed into the Random House Group in February 1997 with the purchase of the Reed Consumer Trade Division.

References

Publishing companies established in 1989
Book publishing companies based in London
Companies disestablished in 1997
Random House
1989 establishments in England
1997 disestablishments in England